The 2014 Newfoundland and Labrador Scotties Tournament of Hearts, the provincial women's curling championship for Newfoundland and Labrador, was held from January 8 to 12 at the RE/MAX Centre in St. John's, Newfoundland and Labrador. The winning Heather Strong team represented Newfoundland and Labrador at the 2014 Scotties Tournament of Hearts in Montreal.

Teams

Round-robin standings
Final round-robin standings

Round-robin results

Draw 1
Wednesday, January 8, 5:00 pm

Draw 2
Thursday, January 9, 9:00 am

Draw 3
Thursday, January 9, 2:30 pm

Draw 4
Friday, January 10, 2:00 pm

Draw 5
Friday, January 10, 7:30 pm

Final
Saturday, January 11, 1:30 pm

External links
Newfoundland and Labrador Curling Association

Sport in St. John's, Newfoundland and Labrador
Newfoundland and Labrador
Newfoundland and Labrador Scotties Tournament of Hearts